This is a partial list of Slovenian sportspeople. For the full plain list of Slovenian sportspeople on Wikipedia, see :Category:Slovenian sportspeople.

Alpine skiing

Nataša Bokal
Tomaž Čižman
Alenka Dovžan
Jure Franko
Meta Hrovat
Urška Hrovat
Andrej Jerman
Katja Koren
Jure Košir
Mitja Kunc
Bojan Križaj
Tina Maze
Rok Petrovič
Špela Pretnar
Boris Strel
Mateja Svet

Archery

Gregor Rajh
Dejan Sitar
Klemen Štrajhar

Athletics
Britta Bilač
Borut Bilač
Alenka Bikar
Brigita Bukovec
Gregor Cankar
Jolanda Čeplak
Primož Kozmus
Brigita Langerholc
Stanko Lorger
Matic Osovnikar
Merlene Ottey
Martina Ratej
Sonja Roman
Marija Šestak
Draga Stamejčič
Nataša Urbančič

Badminton
Jasmina Keber
Maja Tvrdy

Basketball
Nika Barič
Sani Bečirović
Ivo Daneu
Luka Dončić
Goran Dragić
Vinko Jelovac
Jaka Lakovič
Erazem Lorbek
Marko Milič
Boštjan Nachbar
Radoslav Nesterović
Matjaž Smodiš
Beno Udrih
Peter Vilfan
Sasha Vujačić
Jure Zdovc
Aljoša Žorga
Miha Zupan

Biathlon

Klemen Bauer
Jakov Fak
Teja Gregorin
Andreja Grašič
Tomas Globočnik
Andreja Mali
Janez Marič

Boxing
Dejan Zavec

Canoeing

Jernej Abramič
Dare Bernot
Natan Bernot
Luka Božič
Simon Hočevar
Jože Ilija
Andrej Jelenc
Peter Kauzer
Urša Kragelj
Jure Meglič
Ajda Novak
Špela Ponomarenko Janić
Benjamin Savšek
Marjan Štrukelj
Sašo Taljat
Eva Terčelj
Miha Terdič
Andraž Vehovar
Jože Vidmar
Milan Zadel

Climbing
Janja Garnbret
Jernej Kruder
Mina Markovič
Mia Krampl
Domen Škofic

Cross-country skiing

Vesna Fabjan
Petra Majdič
Katja Višnar

Cycling

Marko Baloh
Grega Bole
Valter Bonča
Borut Božič
Janez Brajkovič
Primož Čerin
Jure Golčer
Andrej Hauptman
Blaža Klemenčič
Jure Kocjan
Kristijan Koren
Marko Kump
Luka Mezgec
Matej Mohorič
Tadej Pogačar
Jan Polanc
Jure Robič
Primož Roglič
Simon Špilak
Gorazd Štangelj
Tadej Valjavec
Tanja Žakelj

Fencing
Rudolf Cvetko

Figure skating
Mojca Kopač
Teodora Poštič
Gregor Urbas

Football

Milenko Ačimovič
Marko Elsner
Samir Handanović
Josip Iličić
Srečko Katanec
Robert Koren
Tim Matavž
Džoni Novak
Milivoje Novaković
Branko Oblak
Jan Oblak
Danilo Popivoda
Zlatko Zahovič

Freestyle skiing

Filip Flisar

Gymnastics

Miroslav Cerar
Stane Derganc
Aljaž Pegan
Mitja Petkovšek
Josip Primožič
Leon Štukelj
Peter Šumi

Handball
Alenka Cuderman
Dragan Gajić
Ana Gros
Iztok Puc
Rolando Pušnik
Renato Vugrinec
Uroš Zorman
Luka Žvižej

Ice hockey

David Rodman
Marcel Rodman
Edo Hafner
Rudi Hiti
Žiga Jeglič
Robert Kristan
Anže Kopitar
Jan Muršak
Žiga Pance
Tomaž Razingar
Zvone Šuvak
Rok Tičar

Judo

Vlora Bedeti
Rok Drakšič
Petra Nareks
Lucija Polavder
Aljaž Sedej
Raša Sraka
Tina Trstenjak
Anamari Velenšek
Urška Žolnir

Nordic combined
Gašper Berlot
Marjan Jelenko
Mitja Oranič

Rowing

Iztok Čop
Milan Janša
Janez Klemenčič
Sašo Mirjanič
Sadik Mujkič
Bojan Prešern
Luka Špik
Denis Žvegelj

Sailing

Vesna Dekleva
Klara Maučec
Vasilij Žbogar

Ski jumping

Rok Benkovič
Jernej Damjan
Matjaž Debelak
Damjan Fras
Robert Kranjec
Franci Petek
Primož Peterka
Peter Prevc
Jurij Tepeš
Miran Tepeš
Primož Ulaga
Matjaž Zupan
Peter Žonta

Snowboarding

Rok Flander
Dejan Košir
Žan Košir
Rok Marguč
Tim-Kevin Ravnjak
Cilka Sadar

Shooting

Rajmond Debevec

Swimming

Anja Čarman
Anton Cerer
Damir Dugonjič
Sara Isaković
Alenka Kejžar
Anja Klinar
Igor Majcen
Peter Mankoč
Matjaž Markič
Darjan Petrič
Borut Petrič
Metka Sparavec

Table tennis
Bojan Tokič

Taekwondo
Franka Anić
Ivan Trajkovič

Tennis

Aljaž Bedene
Polona Hercog
Mima Jaušovec
Blaž Kavčič
Tina Križan
Katarina Srebotnik
Grega Žemlja

See also
Sport in Slovenia
Slovenia at the Olympics
Slovenia at the Paralympics

Slovenia
Sports